Jonathan Elliot (1784–1846) was a 19th-century American historian who produced two influential collections of documents connected with the early American republic. The first was a five-volume collection entitled The Debates in the Several State Conventions on the Adoption of the Federal Constitution (commonly called Elliot's Debates), which encompassed the time between the 1787 Constitutional Convention and the opening of the government under the newly ratified constitution in 1789. This work for many years was the most complete source of primary material from this period. It was first published between 1827 and 1830, and issued in a revised version in 1861 after Elliot's death.  It has long been criticized for its haphazard and biased editing, and it has been rendered obsolete by the Documentary History of the Ratification of the Constitution and the Bill of Rights, 1787-1791, launched in 1976 by the historian Merrill Jensen and continued by his students John P. Kaminski, Gaspare J. Saladino, Richard Leffler, and Charles Schoenleber.

The second collection is the 1832 work The Virginia and Kentucky Resolutions of 1798 and '99; with Jefferson's Original Draught Thereof. Also, Madison's Report, Calhoun's Address, Resolutions of the Several States in Relation to State Rights. With Other Documents in Support of the Jeffersonian Doctrines of '98. This book contained the Virginia and Kentucky Resolutions, the Report of 1800, and other documents in support of the states' rights position, which was at that time under fire due to the nullification crisis. As H. Jefferson Powell puts it, Elliot was more than "simply an assiduous gatherer of historical information about the Constitution: he was an active participant…in the constitutional debates of his day."

References
 Powell, H. Jefferson. "The Principles of '98: An Essay in Historical Retrieval." Virginia Law Review 80 (1994): 689–743.

Notes

External links
 
 Elliot's Debates at the Library of Congress

American print editors
American historians
1784 births
1846 deaths